The College Student Alliance (CSA) is a provincial advocacy organization in Ontario that represents students attending community colleges. The alliance represents 8 colleges and 10 student associations with over 78,000 student members.

Founded in 1975 as the Ontario Community College Student Parliamentary Association (OCCSPA), the College Student Alliance (CSA) is an advocacy and student leadership organization which serves Ontario's college students.

CSA's main competencies are advocacy related on behalf of its membership on all issues relating to college education including tuition, accessibility, quality and transferability. Independent of any political or organizational affiliations the CSA is dedicated to championing the needs of Ontario postsecondary students from the students' perspective.

Programs & Service
1. FUNDING TOOLS | A one-stop-shop funding website; with over 500 scholarships, bursaries and grants, and a budget calculator.

2. POINT BANK | CSA's Point Bank program was designed to give back to student associations to better student life for individuals on their campuses. Through promotion of CSA, student associations gain 'points' which turn into dollars. In 2015/16, we distributed over $14,000 to fund food banks on-campus.

3.THE YELLOW UMBRELLA PROJECT | The Yellow Umbrella Project is an annual mental health awareness campaign developed by CSA. Student associations across Ontario participate in the campaign in order to achieve its overall mission: to stop the stigma surrounding mental health and mental illness, and help students recognize the resources available to them on-campus and within their community. The Yellow Umbrella Project coincides with Mental Illness Awareness Week in order to bridge the gap between communities and campuses. CSA provided student associations with marketing material, suggested social media posts and a how-to guide for implementation.

4. STUDENT LEADERSHIP SCHOLARSHIP | CSA's Student Leadership Scholarship is awarded to 12 outstanding student leaders from Ontario colleges who demonstrate exceptional work on campus and in their community. The scholarship is awarded to individuals with proven leadership qualities. Winners are involved within their college community, demonstrating leadership efforts, volunteerism and participation in organizations focused on helping others. CSA's Leadership Scholarship is presented annually by CSA's Board of Directors.

Board of Directors
The Board of Directors are elected by the membership to oversee the organization, provide guidance and future vision. All members of the Board must be current student leaders from within the membership.

The 2018-2019 Board of Directors are:

Staff

 General Manager (Interim) | Jason Baryluk
 Director of Advocacy | Jason Baryluk
 Research & Policy Analyst | Trevor Potts
 Office Manager | Brenda Leciuk

Presidents
 2002-2003 | Jon Olinski
 2003-2004 | Valerie Rothlin
 2004-2005 | Justin Falconer
 2005-2006 | Matt Jackson
 2006-2007 | Matt Jackson
 2007-2008 | Tyler Wiles
 2008-2009 | Jennifer Howarth
 2009-2010 | Justin Fox
 2010-2011 | Justin Fox
 2011-2012 | Brian Costantini
 2012-2013 | Ciara Bryne
 2013-2014 | Curtis Bell
 2014-2015 | Matt Stewart
 2015-2016 | Jeff Scherer
 2016-2017 | Madison Schell
 2017-2018 | Joel Willett/Aimee Calma
 2018-2019 | Brittany Elizabeth Greig
 2019-2021 | Tori Arnett
 2021-Present | Eli Ridder

Executive Directors/General Managers
 1996-1999 | Cynthia Watt
 1999-2002 | Tracy Boyer
 2003 | Jon Olinski
 2004-2005 | Frank Cappadocia
 2005 | Jon Olinski
 2005-2016 | Ted Bartlett
 2016-2018 | Jennifer Nguyen (Howarth)
 2018–2019 | Curtis Bell
 2020–Present | Jason Baryluk

References

External links
 

Ontario students' associations
Groups of students' unions
1975 establishments in Ontario